
Rogaguado Lake is a tropical fresh water in the northern Bolivia, in the Yacuma Province of the Beni Department. It is close to the Rogagua Lake. The lake is 25,40 km long and 18,53 km wide, and it has an area of 315 km², making it one of the biggest lakes in Bolivia. It contains six islands, the biggest ones of 1 km² and the smaller ones of 0,65 km², located at the north side of the lake.

Lakes of Beni Department